Iran competed at the 2019 World Aquatics Championships in Gwangju, South Korea from 12 to 28 July.

Swimming

Iran entered two swimmers.

Men

References

Nations at the 2019 World Aquatics Championships
Iran at the World Aquatics Championships
2019 in Iranian sport